Neptis vikasi, the dingy sailer, is a species of nymphalid butterfly found in Asia, from north-eastern India to Burma and northern Indochina.

References

vikasi
Butterflies of Indochina
Butterflies described in 1829